The discography of Welsh indie pop band Los Campesinos! consists of six studio albums, one live album, two compilation albums, four extended plays and twenty singles.

Los Campesinos! was formed in early 2006 and has gone through a number of line-up changes. Influenced by the twee-pop movement, their first two albums – which are the only two in their discography to feature the same line-up – were both released in 2008. Hold on Now, Youngster... and We Are Beautiful, We Are Doomed both received critical acclaim, prompting their third album in 2010, Romance Is Boring, which was praised for expanding their "already sizeable instrumental palette". 

Their fourth release, Hello Sadness, was released in 2011, followed by No Blues in 2013 and most recently, Sick Scenes in 2017. The band has also released a live album – Good Night for a Fistfight in 2013, and four EPs, most recently Whole Damn Body in 2021.

Albums

Studio albums

Live albums

Compilations

Extended plays

Singles

Heat Rash singles 
In December 2010, the band announced the launch of a quarterly magazine, Heat Rash. The following singles were released exclusively to subscribers, until 2021 when Los Campesinos! released their fourth EP, Whole Damn Body, which compiles remastered versions of all these tracks except for singles from Heat Rash #2.

 Heat Rash #1 (April 2011): "Light Leaves, Dark Sees" b/w "Four Seasons"
 Heat Rash #2 (December 2011): "Dreams Don't Become You" b/w "I Love You (But You're Boring)" (The Beautiful South cover)
 Heat Rash #3 (June 2012): "Allez Les Blues" b/w "Dumb Luck"
 Heat Rash #4 (November 2012): "She Crows" b/w "To the Boneyard"

Remixes 
 Tokyo Police Club – "Tessellate" (credited only to Tom Bromley)
 Johnny Foreigner – "Criminals" (credited only to Bromley)
 White Ring – "Suffocation"
 You Say Party – "Laura Palmer's Prom"
 Parenthetical Girls – "Sympathy for Spastics"

Notes

References 

Pop music group discographies
Discographies of British artists